The Cherry Tree is a children's war novel published by Japanese writer Daisaku Ikedai n 1992  and illustrated by Brian Wildsmith.

Overview 
The book is set in the devastation of post-war Japan. So, in this work, author Daisaku Ikeda dialogue with children ideas such as pacifism and environmentalism. The main character, a boy called Tahiti, saves the life of an old cherry tree that was burned in an air raid and was about to die. At the same time, he learns to face the reality of his own life and to challenge it. In Japan, the cherry tree is a symbol of strength, courage and hope. In this way, the book reflects on life, love and care for others from the perspective of a child.

Reception 
The Cherry Tree received critical acclaim, with the Canadian newspaper Toronto Star defining the narrative as much deeper than one might initially assume. For Publishers Weekly, Ikeda's quiet writing is inspired by the innocence and curiosity embodied in his child protagonists, in order to deliver a fundamental message without didacticism. The book review concludes that is a tender story about the rewards of kindness. The book received several translations and was adapted for the animated movie, in addition to serving as the basis for an acclaimed Brazilian theater play.

References 

20th-century Japanese novels
Children's books
1992 novels
War novels